Matthew Heiti is a Canadian actor, screenwriter, novelist and playwright. As cowriter with Ryan Ward of the film Son of the Sunshine, he was a Genie Award nominee for Best Original Screenplay at the 32nd Genie Awards in 2012.

Born and raised in Sudbury, Ontario, Heiti was educated at Ryerson University and the University of New Brunswick. He subsequently returned to Sudbury, where he has been a playwright-in-residence with the Sudbury Theatre Centre since 2011. His plays include Black Dog: 4 vs the World, Mucking in the Drift, Aviatrix: An Unreal Story of Amelia Earhart, Affidavit, Scar, Place to Be: The Nick Drake Project, Just Beyond the Trees and Plague.

Heiti served as the playwright-in-residence for the Sudbury Theatre Centre for the 2011/2012 season. As playwright-in-residence at STC, Heiti ran the Playwrights’ Junction, a workshop for developing writers.

He published his debut novel, The City Still Breathing, with Coach House Press in 2013.

References

External links

Canadian male novelists
Canadian male stage actors
Canadian male film actors
21st-century Canadian dramatists and playwrights
21st-century Canadian novelists
Male actors from Greater Sudbury
Writers from Greater Sudbury
Living people
Toronto Metropolitan University alumni
University of New Brunswick alumni
Canadian male screenwriters
Canadian male dramatists and playwrights
21st-century Canadian male writers
21st-century Canadian screenwriters
Year of birth missing (living people)